Princess Twilight Sparkle, commonly known as Twilight Sparkle, is a fictional character who appears in the fourth incarnation (also referred to as the fourth generation or "G4") of Hasbro's My Little Pony toyline and media franchise, beginning with My Little Pony: Friendship Is Magic (2010–2019). She is voiced by Tara Strong while her singing voice is provided by Rebecca Shoichet.

Based on the first generation or "G1" unicorn toy Twilight and created by Lauren Faust, in Friendship Is Magic, she is depicted as a studious, bookish anthropomorphic unicorn (later an alicorn). Her mentor, Princess Celestia, guides her to learn about friendship in the town of Ponyville. Twilight and her dragon assistant Spike become close friends with five other ponies: Applejack, Rarity, Fluttershy, Rainbow Dash, and Pinkie Pie. Each of the ponies represent a different facet of friendship, and Twilight discovers herself to be a key part of the magical artifacts known as the "Elements of Harmony". The ponies travel on adventures and help others around Equestria while working out problems that arise in their own friendships.

Faust originally envisioned the characters to be relatable and unique with different personalities and flaws, unlike many other girls' shows. The creative team also incorporated each of the characters' personalities into various things, such as Twilight's purple color signifying her royalty and mystical awareness. Twilight garnered praise for her humility, relatability and maturity.

Appearances

Friendship Is Magic

At the start of the series, Twilight is a bookworm and Princess Celestia's protégé; she has a talent for magic and is a unicorn. She travels to the town of Ponyville with her dragon assistant Spike due to Celestia's request for her to make friends. There, she becomes close friends with five other ponies: Applejack, Rainbow Dash, Rarity, Fluttershy, and Pinkie Pie. The six defeat a villain known as "Nightmare Moon", who is Celestia's sister Luna, and discover they represent artifacts known as the "Elements of Harmony", with Twilight representing the element of magic. Twilight decides to stay in Ponyville and sends letters to Celestia about the challenges she and her new friends overcome. After helping to defeat villains such as Discord, the spirit of chaos, Queen Chrysalis, the leader of the changelings, creatures which can shapeshift, and King Sombra, a dark unicorn seeking to take over the Crystal Empire, and fixing a spell by famed wizard Star Swirl the Bearded, Twilight graduates from her studies with Celestia and becomes an alicorn and a princess. She later becomes the "Princess of Friendship", with the responsibility to spread friendship across Equestria.

After stopping her cult and convincing her to make friends, Twilight becomes Starlight Glimmer's teacher on friendship. After the events of My Little Pony: The Movie, Twilight opens a school of friendship that accepts all creatures, including hippogriffs, changelings, griffins, yaks, and dragons. In the season nine premiere, Celestia and Luna decide to abdicate from the throne, letting Twilight take over leadership of Equestria. Though initially panicked, Twilight gains more confidence over the season, especially after defeating her past enemies. After her coronation, she starts the Council of Friendship, which consists of her and her friends, who meet once a moon.

Best Gift Ever

After Twilight stresses out about Hearth's Warming presents and Princess Cadance, Shining Armour, and Flurry Heart's visit, her friends decide to do a "Hearth's Warming Helper. As part of it, Twilight needs to get a gift for Pinkie Pie. Twilight finds a recipe for a legendary magic pudding that is dangerous if prepared incorrectly. She becomes stressed trying to both prepare it and entertain Shining Armor and Princess Cadence. Unbeknownst to them, Flurry Heart adds extra ingredients that cause the pudding to boil over. After the pudding floods Twilight's castle, Pinkie Pie uses her present to stabilize it.

Rainbow Roadtrip

Twilight and her friends travel to the town of Hope Hollow to attend their annual Rainbow Festival after Rainbow Dash had been invited as a guest of honor. When they arrive, they find that the town's color had faded away. Twilight and her friends start working to restore the town's color and bring the Rainbow Festival back.

Pony Life

Twilight Sparkle appears alongside the rest of the Mane Six in the series My Little Pony: Pony Life. The show features a different animation technique and focuses more on slice of life-style stories than Friendship Is Magic. In Pony Life, she never appears as a unicorn, appearing as an alicorn from the beginning of the series, but is never referred to as a princess.

Equestria Girls

Twilight appears as a main character in the first two My Little Pony: Equestria Girls films.

In the first film, Twilight travels through a magic mirror to the human world with Spike when Sunset Shimmer steals her crown containing the Element of Magic. There, she poses as a new student at Canterlot High School and befriends the human counterparts of her friends in Equestria. They help her win the election for Princess of the school's Fall Formal, and together they defeat and reform Sunset when she tries to use the crown to brainwash the students into becoming her personal army to invade Equestria.

In the second film, Twilight returns to the human world with Spike when Sunset uses her magic book to warn her of the emergence of the Dazzlings, creatures from Equestria who have the ability to use their singing voices to manipulate others. She is then recruited to join her Canterlot High School friends' band, the Rainbooms, as the temporary lead singer to compete in the school's Battle of the Bands. As they prepare for the contest, she works on a counter-spell to break the mind-control spell the Dazzlings placed on the students. With Sunset's help, the Rainbooms defeat the Dazzlings and leave them powerless. After she returns to Equestria with Spike, Sunset keeps in touch with her using her magic book.

In the pre-credits scene of the third film, Twilight returns to the human world after the events of "The Cutie Re-Mark" and meets her human counterpart.

Twilight occasionally makes appearances in subsequent Equestria Girls media, often for guidance on Equestrian magic.

My Little Pony: The Movie

While Twilight and her friends are preparing Equestria's first Friendship Festival in Canterlot, the city comes under attack by the army of an evil conqueror called the Storm King, led by his second-in-command, Tempest Shadow, a unicorn with a broken horn. Twilight and her friends journey beyond Equestria to defeat the Storm King and make new allies in the process. However, after denouncing her friends, Twilight is captured by Tempest and drained of her magic. Twilight's friends return to Equestria with the help of their new allies and they save Equestria with the help of Tempest.

My Little Pony: A New Generation

Twilight makes a cameo appearance at the start of the film, during an imaginary sequence depicting a playtime session between Sunny Starscout, Hitch Trailblazer, and Sprout Cloverleaf that goes awry when Sprout acts as if Rarity were an evil unicorn due to prejudices between the three pony races having resurfaced following Twilight's implied passing. Sunny's Twilight toy makes several appearances through the film at her house, while her cutie mark appears in the film as the symbol in both Sunny's diary and a window in an abandoned Zephyr Heights airport. She is also indirectly mentioned when Sunny's father, Argyle Starshine, narrates her and her friends' adventures to Sunny as a bedtime story.

My Little Pony: Make Your Mark

Twilight makes a cameo appearance in "Growing Pains" where she appears to Sunny Starscout and her friends via a message through the Unity Crystals. She warns them about an "evil pony" that tried to steal all of Equestria's magic years ago.

Friendship is Magic comic series

The first My Little Pony IDW Comic, "The Return of Queen Chrysalis", was published in 2012, in which Twilight and her friends find the ponies in Ponyville replaced by undercover Changelings, similar to "A Canterlot Wedding". Twilight appears as a unicorn in the comics at first. She is seen as an alicorn from issue #13 onwards, published on November 20, 2013. The comics were set in the same world as the television show, but featured original stories about Twilight and her friends unrelated to it until issue #89, after which the TV show ended. From this issue onwards, the comics picked up where the show left off and were officially described as "Season 10". The comics ended after issue #102, published on October 13, 2021, where Twilight and her friends have to protect the Elements of Harmony from the attacks of the Knights of Harmony.

Following the end of "Season 10", a new five-issue miniseries called "My Little Pony: Generations" was announced, in which the Mane Six meet ponies from the first My Little Pony show. The first issue was published on October 20, 2021, the fifth and final issue is expected to be published in February 2022.

In the four-issue crossover comic between My Little Pony and Transformers called "My Little Pony/Transformers: Friendship in Disguise" published from July to November 2020, characters from the Transformers franchise team up with the Mane Six in Equestria to fight off villains from both franchises, who have also formed an alliance with each other. A sequel four-issue miniseries called "My Little Pony/Transformers: The Magic of Cybertron" with a similar plot was published from April to July 2021.

Equestria Girls alternate version
An alternate version of Twilight appears in the post-credits scene of My Little Pony: Equestria Girls — Rainbow Rocks. She is fully introduced in My Little Pony: Equestria Girls – Friendship Games and becomes one of the main characters of the Equestria Girls franchise in other subsequent media. In the next film, My Little Pony: Equestria Girls – Legend of Everfree she is revealed to have become a backup vocalist in the Rainbooms and obtains telekenisis as her geode power.

Development
Hasbro, Inc. produced several incarnations of the My Little Pony franchise, often labeled by collectors as "generations". Just as Michael Bay's film had helped boost the new Transformers toy line, Hasbro wanted to retool the My Little Pony franchise to better suit the current demographic of young girls. According to Margaret Loesch, CEO of Hub Network, revisiting properties that had worked in the past was an important programming decision, which was somewhat influenced by the opinions of the network's programming executives, several of whom were once fans of such shows. Hasbro's senior vice president, Linda Steiner, stated the company "intended to have the show appeal to a larger demographic", with the concept of parents "co-viewing" with their children being a central theme of the Hub Network's programming. Central themes that Hasbro sought for the show included friendship and working together, factors they determined from market research in how girls played with their toys. Outside help was sought to make the characters and stories.

Animator and writer Lauren Faust approached Hasbro to develop her girls' toys property "Galaxy Girls" into an animated series. Faust, who had previously worked on Cartoon Network's The Powerpuff Girls and Foster's Home for Imaginary Friends, had been unsuccessfully pitching animation aimed at girls for years, as cartoons for girls were considered unsuccessful. When she pitched to Lisa Licht of Hasbro Studios, the latter was not very interested, but she showed Faust one of the company's recent My Little Pony animated works, Princess Promenade, "completely on the fly". Licht thought Faust's style was well suited to that line, and asked her to consider "some ideas [on] where to take a new version of the franchise".

Faust agreed to take the job as long as she was able to move away from the "silliness of [My Little Pony's] predecessors and their patronizing attitudes towards young girls." She regarded girls' entertainment as too sweet, plain, and obvious which did not fit their intelligence and "talk[ed] down to [them]". Unlike most girls' shows, in which, according to Faust, the characters have "one archetype" and "the only difference between any of them is this one likes pink and this one likes blue", she insisted on characters with dimension who were different from one another and had their own flaws. Faust aimed for the characters to be "relatable" characters, using "icons of girliness" (such as the bookworm) to broaden the appeal of the characters for the young female audience. She based many characters of the principal cast on how she had envisioned the original ponies, including Twilight on the namesake first generation character.

Each of the main characters had expressions and mannerisms distinctive to them as well as general expressions they shared. According to the DHX Media team, they "avoid[ed] certain expressions if it [went] outside [the ponies'] personality". The creative team incorporated each character's personality into their mannerisms, facial expressions, props, and home environment. Twilight had a different cutie mark and hair color when she was first created. Her original cutie mark's heavenly design highlighted her royalty and mystical knowledge, reflected in her purple color, but it was changed to convey that she is lively and unique to the pony world. Twilight's hard, angular edges personify her as a tidy pony. Like other ponies, Twilight's body does not feature shading; her mane and tail lack depth and are generally fixed shapes, animated by bending and stretching them in curves in three dimensions and giving them a sense of movement without the cost of individual hairs. Twilight also influenced the design of Golden Oak Library, her home for the first four seasons. It represents her various hobbies, and with its numerous hooks, storage cubbies, and stairways, the tree's curving, organic interior indicates a mind.

Voice

Tara Strong and Faust first met on The Powerpuff Girls. After developing Friendship Is Magic pitch bible, Faust asked Strong to help her complete it by voicing Twilight, Pinkie Pie, and Applejack or Rainbow Dash. Faust had expected Strong to book the role of Pinkie Pie as she was similar to Bubbles, who the actress had voiced in The Powerpuff Girls. However, following hearing Strong voicing Twilight, Faust offered her the role. The actress viewed the character as "authentic and conscientious and sweet but strong and a little bit nerdy". To voice Twilight, Strong made her voice higher.

Rebecca Shoichet initially became involved with the series through frequent collaborator Daniel Ingram, who composed the songs for the show. She performed a number of song demos for him, including for the PBS animated series Martha Speaks. During the show's casting phase, Shoichet was cast as Twilight's singing voice after recording a demo for the series' theme song because she sounded similar to Strong.

Reception

Analysis
Several writers have commented on what Twilight represents. According to Pavol Kosnáč, Twilight connects the Mane 6 together. Theresia Sitinjak, a writer at Diponegoro University, stated Twilight represents the American cultural values of individualism, altruism, and industry. She stated that Twilight's adventurous life, how she provides her friends with spirit, her belief in herself, optimism, and alone time reflect her individualism. Sitinjak said her finding of the meaning of life — friendship, acceptance of her wrongdoings, efforts to do her best, close friends who support and love her; and work to improve her society and save her country — symbolizes her altruism. The writer believed Twilight's industry is exemplified by her high standards, responsibility, leadership, and dreams. Of the American cultural values, Sitinjak thought altruism was the main one to be seen in Twilight's personality. Ethan Lewis, from Den of Geek, asserted she "embodies many contradictions"; for example, he wrote that though "[s]he is rational, logical and scientific[,] ... her element of harmony is magic." In journal Transatlantica, Isabelle Licari-Guillaume insisted that Twilight is a "convincing figurehead" for nerd culture and a major factor in the success of the series.

Some have said she has mental disorders. Anna Dobbie of Den of Geek argued that "Twilight's bookish reserve hints at Avoidant Personality Disorder, and, less subtly, OCD ". Supervising director Jayson Thiessen stated Twilight is "kind of a neurotic perfectionist ... [with] a touch of OCD".

Critical response

Journalists
The Mary Sue called Twilight mature and praised her nerdy aspects. Lewis opined Twilight is "one of the more complex characters of this show". Comic Book Resources ranked Twilight as the second best character Strong had voiced.

Fandom
As of 2019, Twilight is usually cited as the character that the Friendship Is Magic fandom most relate with.

References

Citations

Works cited
 
 
 
 

My Little Pony: Friendship Is Magic
Female characters in animated series
Fictional characters who can teleport
Fictional child prodigies
Fictional librarians
Fictional principals and headteachers
Fictional schoolteachers
Fictional telekinetics
Fictional female scientists
Crossover characters in television
Fictional unicorns
Winged unicorns
My Little Pony characters
Fictional bibliophiles
Animated characters introduced in 2010
Television characters introduced in 2010